David Lauser (born 20 February 1951) is an American rock drummer, who is most famous for playing with Sammy Hagar.

Sammy Hagar and David Lauser played together in a band called Justice Brothers before Sammy Hagar joined Montrose.

Lauser later played on various Sammy Hagar solo albums, starting with Standing Hampton, and is now a member of The Waboritas, and has also played with Sammy Hagar in Los Tres Gusanos.

Lauser's first marriage to Jacqueline Cushen in 1982 resulted in having one daughter, Danielle Marie, also known affectionately as "Ella Bean." In 2002, Lauser married his second wife. On January 4, 2015, his wife Liza Cozad-Lauser died from cancer.

David Lauser continues to tour with Sammy Hagar's Wabos and December People, a charitable rock and roll holidays band.

Discography

With Sammy Hagar solo
Standing Hampton
Three Lock Box
VOA
I Never Said Goodbye
Unboxed
Cosmic Universal Fashion

With Sammy Hagar And The Waboritas
Red Voodoo
Ten 13
Not 4 Sale
Live: Hallelujah
Livin' It Up

With Alliance
Alliance - 1991
Bond of Union - 1991
Missing Piece - 1996
Destination Known - 2007
Road to Heaven - 2008

Equipment
 DW drums and pedals.
 Paiste cymbals.
 Remo drum heads.
 Vic Firth drum sticks.
 Gibraltar hardware.

References

External links
David Lauser website
The Number One Sammy Hagar Discography
Dave Lauser Interview NAMM Oral History Library (2020)

American rock drummers
Sammy Hagar & the Waboritas members
1951 births
Living people
People from San Bernardino, California